Betula raddeana is a species of plant in the Betulaceae family. It is found in Georgia and Russia. It is threatened by habitat loss.

References

raddeana
Trees of Russia
Flora of Georgia (country)
Flora of Russia
Taxonomy articles created by Polbot